Dolophones turrigera is a species of spider indigenous to Australia. It was first described in 1867 by Ludwig von Koch. It is able to camouflage itself among plant material during the day and spins a web at night.

References 

Araneidae
Spiders of Australia
Spiders described in 1867